Guy Henniart (born 1953, Santes) is a French mathematician at Paris-Sud 11 University. He is known for his contributions to the Langlands program, in particular his proof of the local Langlands conjecture for GL(n) over a p-adic local field—independently from Michael Harris and Richard Taylor—in 2000.

Henniart attained his doctorate from the University of Paris V in 1978, under supervision of Pierre Cartier with thesis Représentations du groupe de Weil d’un corps local. He was a member of Nicolas Bourbaki. Henniart was an invited speaker at the International Congress of Mathematicians in 2006 at Madrid and gave a talk On the local Langlands and Jacquet-Langlands correspondences.

Selected publications

 with Colin Bushnell:

References

External links

Henri Carayol: Preuve de la conjecture de Langlands locale pour GLn: travaux de Harris-Taylor et Henniart, Séminaire Bourbaki 41, 1998–1999, pp. 191–243 (Exposé 857)

1953 births
Living people
École Normale Supérieure alumni
20th-century French mathematicians
21st-century French mathematicians
University of Paris alumni
Academic staff of the University of Strasbourg
Academic staff of the Humboldt University of Berlin
Nicolas Bourbaki